Chan Peng Kong (born 15 May 1956) is a chess player from Singapore. He was awarded by FIDE the title International Master (IM) in 2002. He won the national Singaporean Chess Championship in 1999 on tie-break score. Chan represented Singapore eight times in the Chess Olympiad (1982, 1984, 1986, 1990, 2000, 2002, 2004, 2006, 2008, 2010). He won the Seniors 50+ section of the ASEAN+ Age Group Chess Championships in 2007, 2012 and 2013.

References

External links

Chan Peng Kong chess games at 365Chess.com

1956 births
Living people
Chess International Masters
Singaporean chess players
Chess Olympiad competitors
Singaporean sportspeople of Chinese descent